Aribert Reimann (born 4 March 1936) is a German composer, pianist and accompanist, known especially for his literary operas. His version of Shakespeare's King Lear, the opera Lear, was written at the suggestion of Dietrich Fischer-Dieskau, who sang the title role. His opera Medea after Grillparzer's play premiered in 2010 at the Vienna State Opera. He was a professor of contemporary Lied in Hamburg and Berlin. In 2011, he was awarded the Ernst von Siemens Music Prize for his life's work.

Life and career

Reimann was born in Berlin. He studied composition, counterpoint and piano at the Musikhochschule Berlin with Boris Blacher and Ernst Pepping, among others. During his studies, he worked as a repetiteur at the Städtische Oper. His first appearances as a pianist and accompanist were in 1957. In the early 1970s, he became a member of the Akademie der Künste in Berlin. He was professor of contemporary Lied at the Musikhochschule Hamburg from 1974 to 1983, then at Berlin's Hochschule der Künste from 1983 to 1998.

Besides his work as composer and music teacher, Reimann is co-editor and pianist of the Edition Zeitgenössisches Lied (contemporary song) CD series of the record laber Orfeo, edition, together with Axel Bauni.

Reimann's reputation as a composer has increased greatly with several great literary operas, including Lear and Das Schloß. Besides these, he has written chamber music, orchestral works and songs. He has been honoured repeatedly, including the Grand Cross of Merit of the Federal Republic of Germany and the Order of Merit of Berlin.

Invited by Walter Fink, he was the seventh composer featured in the annual  of the Rheingau Musik Festival in 1997, in songs and chamber music with the Auryn Quartet, playing the piano himself.

His commissioned work, Cantus for Clarinet and Orchestra, dedicated to the clarinetist and composer Jörg Widmann, was premiered on 13 January 2006, in the WDR's Large Broadcasting Hall in Cologne, Germany, in the presence of the composer, who claims the work was inspired by Claude Debussy's compositions for clarinet.

His opera Medea, after Franz Grillparzer, was premiered at the Vienna State Opera in 2010, conducted by Michael Boder, with Marlis Petersen in the title role.

In 2011 he was awarded the Ernst von Siemens Music Prize "for his life's work".

Awards
Reimann received many awards:
 1962 Berliner Kunstpreis für Musik (Junge Generation) – Berlin Art Prize for Music (Young Generation)
 1963 Villa Massimo scholarship
 1965 Robert-Schumann-Preis der Stadt Düsseldorf
 1966 Förderungspreis der Stadt Stuttgart
 1985 Großes Verdienstkreuz des Verdienstordens der Bundesrepublik Deutschland (Commander's Cross of the Order of Merit of the Federal Republic of Germany)
 1985 Braunschweiger Ludwig-Spohr-Preis – Ludwig Spohr Prize of Braunschweig
 1986 Prix de composition musicale de la Fondation Prince Pierre de Monaco – Prize for musical composition, from the Prince Pierre of Monaco Foundation
 1987 Bach Prize of the Free and Hanseatic City of Hamburg
 1991 Frankfurter Musikpreis
 1993 Officier de "L'Ordre du Mérite Culturel" de la Principauté de Monaco
 1993 Pour le Mérite for Arts and Sciences, Germany
 1995 Großes Verdienstkreuz mit Stern des Verdienstordens der Bundesrepublik Deutschland (Knight Commander's Cross of the Order of Merit of the Federal Republic of Germany)
 1999 Commandeur de "L'Ordre du Mérite Culturel" de la Principauté de Monaco (Commander of the Order of Cultural Merit of the Principality of Monaco)
 1999 Goldene Nadel der Dramatiker Union
 2002 Preis der Kulturstiftung Dortmund
 2002 Berliner Kunstpreis
 2006 Arnold Schönberg Prize
 2011 Ernst von Siemens Music Prize
 2016 Robert Schumann Prize for Poetry and Music Mainz
 2018 Deutscher Theaterpreis Der Faust (lifetime achievement award)

Works

Stage
Ein Traumspiel (libretto by Carla Henius, after Strindberg's A Dream Play, translated by Peter Weiss, premiered on 20 June 1965 at the Opernhaus Kiel
 (libretto by Günter Grass, premiered on 7 October 1970 at the Deutsche Oper Berlin
Melusine (after Yvan Goll) (1971)
Lear (after William Shakespeare's King Lear) (1978)
Die Gespenstersonate (after August Strindberg's play The Ghost Sonata) (1984)
Troades (after Euripides' The Trojan Women) (1986)
Das Schloß (after Franz Kafka's Das Schloss) (1992)
Bernarda Albas Haus (after Federico García Lorca's The House of Bernarda Alba)
Medea (after part 3 of Franz Grillparzer's ) (2010)
L'Invisible (after Maurice Maeterlinck's L'Intruse, L'Intérieur and La Mort de Tintagiles) (2017)

Orchestral
Variations for Orchestra
Nahe Ferne (Near Distance)
Cantus für Klarinette und Orchester (Cantus for Clarinet and Orchestra)
Sieben Fragmente für Orchester in memoriam Robert Schumann (Seven Fragments for Orchestra, in memoriam Robert Schumann) (1988)
 Violin Concerto (1996)

Vocal music
 Zyklus nach Gedichten von Paul Celan für Bariton und Klavier (Cycle based on the poetry of Paul Celan for baritone and piano) (1956)
 Wolkenloses Christfest Requiem nach Gedichten von Otfried Büthe, dedicated to Dietrich Fischer-Dieskau and Siegfried Palm (1974)
Nachtstück II für Baryton und Klavier (1978)
 Unrevealed, Lord Byron to Augusta Leigh für Bariton und Streichquartett (1981)
 Requiem für Sopran, Mezzosopran, Bariton, gemischten Chor und Orchester unter Verwendung des lateinischen Requiemtextes und von Versen aus dem Buch Hiob (1982)
 Shine and Dark für Bariton und Klavier (left hand) (1989)
 Entsorgt für Bariton-Solo (1989)
 Eingedunkelt für Alt-Solo (Eingedunkelt for Alto Solo) (1992)
 Fünf Lieder nach Gedichten von Paul Celan für Countertenor und Klavier (Five Songs based on the poetry of Paul Celan for countertenor and piano) (1994/2001)
An Hermann für Tenor und Klavier  (2008)

References

Further reading 
 Luigi Bellingardi, Alcune riflessioni sulla »Gespenstersonate« di Aribert Reimann, in: Sabine Ehrmann-Herfort/Markus Engelhardt (eds.), »Vanitatis fuga, Aeternitatis amor«. Wolfgang Witzenmann zum 65. Geburtstag, »Analecta Musicologica«, vol. 36, Laaber (Laaber) 2005, pp. 689–695.
 Siglind Bruhn, Aribert Reimanns Vokalmusik. Waldkirch, Edition Gorz 2016. 
 Wolfgang Burde, Aribert Reimann, Mainz (Schott) 2005.
 Albert Gier, Zurück zu Shakespeare! Claus H. Hennebergs Lear-Libretto für Aribert Reimann und seine englische Übersetzung von Desmond Clayton, in: Herbert Schneider/Rainer Schmusch (eds.), Librettoübersetzung: Interkulturalität im europäischen Musiktheater, Hildesheimn (Olms) 2009, »Musikwissenschaftliche Publikationen«, vol. 32), pp. 329–349.
 Kii-Ming Lo, Unsichtbarer Herrscher über ein gehorsames Volk. Aribert Reimanns Oper »Das Schloß« nach Franz Kafka, in: Peter Csobádi, Gernot Gruber, Ulrich Müller et al. (eds.), »Weine, weine, du armes Volk!« ─ Das verführte und betrogene Volk auf der Bühne, »Kongreßbericht Salzburg 1994«, Anif/Salzburg (Müller-Speiser) 1995, pp. 663–674.
 Jürgen Maehder, Aribert Reimanns »Nachtstück« ─ Studien zu musikalischer Struktur und Sprachvertonung, in: Aurora (»Jahrbuch der Eichendorff-Gesellschaft«) 36/1976, p. 107-121.
 Jürgen Maehder, Aribert Reimanns »Lear« ─ Anmerkungen zu einigen Strukturproblemen der Literaturoper, program book for the world premiere at the Bavarian State Opera in Munich, München (Bayerische Staatsoper) 1978, pp. 61–73.
 Jürgen Maehder, Anmerkungen zu einigen Strukturproblemen der Literaturoper, in: Klaus Schultz (ed.), Aribert Reimanns »Lear«. Weg einer neuen Oper, München (dtv) 1984, pp. 79–89.
 Jürgen Maehder, Aribert Reimann and Paul Celan: The Setting of Hermetic Poetry in the Contemporary German Lied, in: Claus Reschke/Howard Pollack (eds.), German Literature and Music. An Aesthetic Fusion: 1890─1989, »Houston German Studies«, vol. 8, München (Fink) 1992, pp. 263–292.
 Jürgen Maehder, Étude sur le théâtre musical d'Aribert Reimann ─ de »Lear« à »La sonate des spectres«, programme de salle pour l'Opéra National du Rhin, Strasbourg (TNOR) 1998, pp. 27–45.
 Jürgen Maehder, Untersuchungen zum Musiktheater Aribert Reimanns. Musikalische Dramaturgie in »Lear« und »Die Gespenstersonate«, in: Jürgen Kühnel/Ulrich Müller/Oswald Panagl (eds.), Musiktheater der Gegenwart. Text und Komposition, Rezeption und Kanonbildung, Anif/Salzburg (Müller-Speiser) 2008, .
 Jürgen Maehder, Aribert Reimann et Paul Celan. La mise en musique de la poésie hermétique dans le lied allemand contemporain, in: Antoine Bonnet/ Frédéric Marteau (eds.), Paul Celan, la poésie, la musique. »Avec une clé changeante«, Paris (Hermann) 2015, .
 Klaus Schultz (ed.), Aribert Reimanns »Lear«. Weg einer neuen Oper, München (dtv) 1984.
 Ulrich Tadday (ed.), Aribert Reimann, »Musik-Konzepte«, vol. 139, München (text + kritik) 2008.
 Anselm Weyer: Günter Grass und die Musik (= »Kölner Studien zur Literaturwissenschaft«, vol. 16). Peter Lang, Frankfurt am Main u. a. 2007,  (Zugleich: Köln, Universität, Dissertation, 2005).
 Sigrid Wiesmann (ed.), Für und Wider die Literaturoper'', »Thurnauer Schriften zum Musiktheater«, vol. 6, Laaber (Laaber) 1982.

External links

Interview with Aribert Reimann, 16 May 1997

1936 births
Living people
20th-century classical composers
21st-century classical composers
German opera composers
Male opera composers
Musicians from Berlin
Recipients of the Pour le Mérite (civil class)
Knights Commander of the Order of Merit of the Federal Republic of Germany
Recipients of the Order of Merit of Berlin
Composers awarded knighthoods
Musicians awarded knighthoods
Members of the Academy of Arts, Berlin
German male classical composers
20th-century German composers
Ernst von Siemens Music Prize winners
21st-century German composers
20th-century German male musicians
21st-century German male musicians